Orson Welles Great Mysteries is a British television series originally transmitted between 1973 and 1974, produced by Anglia Television for the ITV network.

The series is an anthology of mystery stories. Each episode is introduced by Orson Welles, the only regular actor in the series, whose appearances were confined to the introductory and closing sequences. In the opening titles, Welles appears shown in silhouette walking through a hallway towards the camera, smoking a cigar and outfitted in a broad-brimmed hat and a huge cloak. When he actually appears on-screen to introduce the episodes, his face is all that is shown, in extreme close-up and very low lighting.

Episodes were directed by Alan Gibson, Peter Sykes, Peter Sasdy, Philip Saville, James Ferman and Alan Cooke. The framing sequences featuring Orson Welles were written by Welles and filmed by Gary Graver. The theme music for the series was composed by John Barry.

Episodes
 Captain Rogers (starring Donald Pleasence)
 The Leather Funnel (starring Christopher Lee, Jane Seymour)
 A Terribly Strange Bed
 La Grande Bretèche (starring Peter Cushing, Susannah York)
 The Dinner Party (starring Joan Collins)
 Money to Burn (starring Victor Buono)
 In the Confessional (starring José Ferrer)
 Unseen Alibi (starring Dean Stockwell)
 Battle of Wits (starring Ian Bannen)
 A Point of Law
 The Monkey's Paw (starring Patrick Magee, Cyril Cusack, Megs Jenkins)
 The Ingenious Reporter
 Death of an Old-Fashioned Girl
 For Sale - Silence (starring Jack Cassidy)
 The Inspiration of Mr. Budd (starring Hugh Griffith)
 An Affair of Honour (starring Harry Andrews, Michael Gambon)
 Farewell to the Faulkners
 The Power of Fear (starring Shirley Knight)
 Where There Is a Will (starring Richard Johnson)
 A Time to Remember (starring Patrick Macnee and Charles Gray)
 Ice Storm (starring Claire Bloom)
 Come Into My Parlour (starring Anne Jackson)
 Compliments of the Season (starring Eli Wallach)
 Under Suspicion 
 Trial for Murder (starring Ian Holm)
 The Furnished Room (starring Clarence Williams III)

Parody

Welles' introductory sequence was parodied by Benny Hill (as "Orson Buggy") in an episode of  his television program.

Availability

The home media rights are held by ITV Studios. In 2019 Network released half of the series on Region 2 DVD as Volume 1 in the UK.

Volume 2 released Oct 26th 2020.

References

External links

1973 British television series debuts
1974 British television series endings
1970s British drama television series
1970s British anthology television series
ITV television dramas
Orson Welles
Television series by ITV Studios
Television shows produced by Anglia Television
English-language television shows
Television series by 20th Century Fox Television